Grimelda of Hungary was a Hungarian princess and a Dogaressa of Venice by marriage to Doge Otto Orseolo (r. 1009—1026). She was the daughter of Géza, Grand Prince of the Hungarians and Princess Sarolt.

Grimelda married the Doge Otto Orseolo (r. 1009—1026). She followed Otto to Constantinople after his deposition. Otto and Grimelda’s children were Peter, King of Hungary and Frozza Orseolo.

References 

House of Árpád
11th-century Hungarian people
11th-century Hungarian women
Dogaressas of Venice
11th-century Venetian people
11th-century Venetian women
Hungarian princesses